Psilopterus (Greek for "bare wing") is an extinct genus of phorusrhacid ("terror bird") from the Middle Oligocene to possibly the Late Pleistocene of Argentina and Uruguay. The birds resemble the modern cariama (Cariama cristata), except with a heavier build and considerably smaller wings. The strong morphological similarity between the claws of the predatory cariama and Psilopterus, both of which are sharp, curved, and laterally compressed, may indicate they were used to strike prey. In contrast to the other, larger terror birds, Tonni and Tambussi also suggested Psilopterus could use their claws to climb trees, and could even fly, but this has been rejected in more recent literature. Fossil finds in Uruguay indicate the genus may have survived until 96,040 ± 6,300 years ago, millions of years after the larger phorusrhacids became extinct.

Description and taxonomy 
The most recent systematic revision of Phorusrhacidae placed Psilopterus within the subfamily Psilopterinae, along with the genera Procariama and Paleopsilopterus, and divided Psilopterus into four species.

Psilopterus bachmanni 
Psilopterus bachmanni (Moreno & Mercerat, 1891)  is the smallest species of phorusrhacid, rivaled only by P. affinis. The species (and genera) is defined by the upper portion of a fused ankle and leg bone (the lectotype MLP-168 is a tarsometatarsus). Other material assigned the species includes additional leg bones that are probably from the same bird, and an almost complete skeleton (PUM-15.904) The material is from several sites in the Santa Cruz Formation in the Santa Cruz Province of Argentina dating to the Middle Miocene (Santacrucian). The most important diagnostic characteristics are a low skull and upper jaw (or maxilla; similar to the mesembriornithine phorusrhacids) and the extreme slant of the front edge of the hole just before the eye (rostal portion of the antorbital fenestra), though there are also differences in the rest of the skeleton.

Synonyms:
 Psilopterus bachmanni (Moreno & Mercerat, 1891)
 Patagornis bachmanni Moreno & Mercerat, 1891
 Psilopterus communis Moreno & Mercerat, 1891
 Psilopterus intermedius Moreno & Mercerat, 1891
 Phororhacos delicatus Amegino, 1891
Brodkorb considered Psilopterus minutus Amerghino, 1981 a separate species,  but the incomplete foot bone (tarsometatarsus) is indistinguishable from P. bachmanni.

Psilopterus lemoinei 
 
Psilopterus lemoinei (Moreno & Mercerat, 1891) is contemporaneous with P. bachmanni and likely filled a very similar ecological niche, though P. lemoinei is slightly larger, with an estimated weigh approaching . The species is defined by part of a lower leg bone (the lectotype, MLP-162, is the distal end of a tibiotarsus), but a wide variety of material has been referred to the taxon. This material has been found at a number of sites in the Monte León and Santa Cruz Formations in the Santa Cruz Province of Argentina that are dated to the Middle Miocene (Santacrucian). Diagnostic characteristics include a higher skull and upper jaw (maxilla), and the front portion of the hole in front of the eyes (rostral edge of the antorbital fenestra) is less slanted.  Additional differences in the remainder of the skeleton are noted in Sinclair and Farr (1932). A number of discrepancies between various specimens have been attributed to differences in age or sex, but material currently assigned to P. lemonei and P. bachmanni may be reclassified at the species level if reexamined in depth.

Synonyms:
 Patagornis lemoinei Moreno & Mercerat, 1891
 Psilopterus australis Moreno & Mercerat, 1891
 Pelecyornis tubulatus Ameghino, 1895 (synonym of Psilopterus australis)
 Phororhacos modicus Ameghino, 1895
 Staphylornis gallardoi Mercerat, 1897 (possible synonym of Psilopterus australis)
 Staphylornis erythacus Mercerat, 1897 (possible synonym of Psilopterus australis)
 Pelecyornis tenuirostris Sinclair & Farr, 1932 (synonym of Psilopterus australis)

Psilopterus affinus 
Psilopterus affinus (Ameghino, 1899) is the most poorly known species of terror bird, represented only by part of a leg bone (tarsometatarsus, MACN-A-52-184) which indicates the bird was very close to P. bachmanni in size. P. affinus is one of several species known from fragmentary material found in 1899 in the Chubut Province of Argentina (Patagonia), in rocks which dated to the Middle to Late Oligocene (Deseadan). Additional specimens might help clarify the taxonomy of the four apparently unrelated species. P. affinus was originally assigned to the genus Phororhacos despite the difference in size, and is distinguished from P. bachmanni by a groove on the leg bone. Bertelli et al. kept this species in Phororhacos. Brodkorb assigned the species to Andrewsornis in 1967, but this is no longer considered accurate.

Psilopterus colzecus 

The most recently discovered species in the genus, Psilopterus colzecus Tonni & Tambussi, 1988, is similar to P. lemoinei in size. Known only from a single incomplete skeleton that includes parts of the jaw, arm, and leg (holotype MLP-76-VI-12-2), the species is defined by a groove in the front of the thigh bone (trochlea). The elements were found in the Arroyo Chasicó Formation in Buenos Aires Province of Argentina and are dated to the Late Miocene (Chasicoan).

Classification 
When P. bachmanni was originally described in 1891, few other birds now known as Phorusrhacids were described, but when Moreno & Mercerat named the taxon, they assigned Psilopterus (then Patagornis) bachmanni to a group with Phorusrhacos, Mesembriornis, and Stereornis, though the latter is now seen as a synonym of Phorusrhacos, that they named Stereornithidae. Since then, Psilopterus was considered the ancestor of larger Phorusrhacids like Mesembriornis and the modern Cariama. In 1927, Psilopterus was placed in its own family and subfamily, Psilopterinae, and later recognized as being in its own family sometimes grouped with other Phorusrhacids like Palaeopsilopterus and Procariama. However, in the phylogenetic analysis by Degrange et al, Psilopterus was found as the only Psilopterine. The following phylogenetic tree shows the internal relationships of Phorusrhacidae under the exclusion of Brontornis as published by Degrange and colleagues in 2015, which recovers Psilopterus as the only member of Psilopterinae as a sister clade to Mesembriornithinae.

Paleoenvironment 
Psilopterus bachmanni & lemoinei lived during the middle Miocene in the Santa Cruz Formation, which preserves mostly a coastal environment, but also forested and grassland regions. The area had little rainfall, so forests developed around lakes and rivers, giving Santa Cruz a diverse environment. During the Miocene, the climate was similar to those of the coasts of Chile with semi-temperate forests and oceanic winds. Grasslands began spreading into Argentina during the Miocene, though much of inner Patagonia was still arid with small rainforests in between. Large, herbivorous, South American notoungulate mammals like the toxodontids Nesodon and Adinotherium were the large low browsers, with rabbit-like interatheriiid Protypotherium being frugivorous. Both mammalian and avian carnivores inhabited the area, the largest being the phorusrhacid Phorusrhacos. marsupials also lived in the region, including the large carnivorous sparassodont Borhyaena. Psilopterus lemoinei is also known from the coastal Monte Leon Formation that was in the same region in Santa Cruz, but part of the older lower Miocene age. Monte Leon preserved more mudstone and estuarine sediments, but with a very similar fauna to the Santa Cruz Formation as the two formations had a direct transition.

References

External links 
 Genus Taxonomy

Phorusrhacidae
Extinct flightless birds
Oligocene birds
Paleogene birds of South America
Miocene birds of South America
Deseadan
Santacrucian
Chasicoan
Huayquerian
Montehermosan
Oligocene Argentina
Pleistocene Argentina
Fossils of Argentina
Oligocene Uruguay
Pleistocene Uruguay
Fossils of Uruguay
Fossil taxa described in 1891